John Gavan Duffy (15 October 1844 – 8 March 1917) was an Australian politician, member of the Victorian Legislative Assembly.

Born in Dublin, Ireland to Charles Gavan Duffy (who would later serve as Premier of Victoria) and Emily McLaughlin, he arrived with his family in Melbourne in August 1859. After some time on his father's farm he was articled as a clerk to a solicitor. In 1874 he married Margaret Mary Callan, the daughter of his father's first cousin Margaret, with whom he had five children. He was admitted as a solicitor to the Supreme Court in 1876. 

While continuing his legal practice, Duffy was elected to the Victorian Legislative Assembly as the member for Dalhousie in 1874; he was defeated in 1886 but returned in a by-election in 1887. In 1889 he transferred to the new seat of Kilmore, Dalhousie and Lancefield, which he represented until 1904. He was Victoria's Minister for Agriculture from March to August 1880, Postmaster-General from 1890 to 1892, Attorney-General from February to April 1892, minister without portfolio from 1892 to 1893, and Postmaster-General again from 1894 to 1899. Duffy died at St Kilda in 1917.

References

1844 births
1917 deaths
Members of the Victorian Legislative Assembly
Irish emigrants to colonial Australia
Knights of St. Gregory the Great
Australian solicitors
Politicians from Melbourne
Attorneys-General of the Colony of Victoria